Glubokoye is a rural locality (a selo) and the administrative center of Glubokovsky Selsoviet, Zavyalovsky District, Altai Krai, Russia. The population was 1,508 as of 2013. There are 24 streets.

Geography 
Glubokoye is located 28 km northwest of Zavyalovo (the district's administrative centre) by road. Malinovsky is the nearest rural locality.

References 

Rural localities in Zavyalovsky District, Altai Krai